School for Scoundrels is a 1960 British comedy film directed by Robert Hamer (and an uncredited Cyril Frankel and Hal E. Chester). It stars Ian Carmichael and Terry-Thomas. It was inspired by the "Gamesmanship" series of books by Stephen Potter. It has been remade twice: in Bollywood under the title Chhoti Si Baat (1975), and in Hollywood as School for Scoundrels (2006).

Plot
Henry Palfrey, the head of a family firm in London, travels to Yeovil to enroll in the "School of Lifemanship", run by its principal Dr. Potter. Arriving late, he overhears Potter explaining to his new intake of students that his courses focus on the science of "being one up on your opponents at all times". Palfrey is given an object lesson by Potter when he interviews them, when he loses a name-calling game without knowing it. When Potter delves in to why Palfrey has enrolled at his school, he deduces a woman is involved. Palfrey proceeds to explain the circumstances behind him travelling to Yeovil, in the form of a flashback. A few weeks prior to enrolling in the School of Lifemanship, Palfrey had an encounter with April Smith, a beautiful woman who he fell in love with after accidentally running into her while trying to catch a bus.

Despite his good fortune of arranging a dinner date with her, Palfrey arrived at work late, where he proceeded to suffer the usual problems - a lack of respect from his employees, and being patronised by the firm's senior clerk Gloatbridge, who commands more respect from the workers and thus makes all the business decisions. Later that evening, Palfrey took April out for dinner, but after finding his reservation was voided for being late, the pair managed to gain entry after encountering a causal acquaintance of Palfrey, Raymond Delauney, who swiftly proceeded to seduce April and cast his friend in a bad light. The following day, Palfrey attempted to acquire a car of his own, after noting the fancy sports car Delauney had, but was conned into buying a ramshackle 1924 car by two second-hand car dealers. The final humiliation for Palfrey came when Delauney suggested a "friendly" tennis match at their local club, which he won easily, leaving Palfrey to feel completely despondent with his life.

Back in the present, Potter recommends Palfrey to pay attention to the courses given. Over the next several weeks, Palfrey proves an apt pupil learning several ploys that can give him an upper hand. In order to complete his education, Potter assigns him a field test of his skills to evaluate him. Returning to London, Palfrey first returns to the car dealers who conned him, and convinces them that, after a tune-up, the vehicle they sold him turns out to be "valuable" and sought-after. Eager to acquire it, the pair offer to trade for it, to which Palfrey cons them into handing over an Austin-Healey sports car and 100 guineas (£105) for the car, which promptly breaks down after he leaves. Returning to his family firm, Palfrey next puts Gloatbridge in his place by pretending he will arrange a merger with a larger firm and that his clerk's bookkeeping has gotten sloppy, allowing him to also earn the respect of his employees in the process.

Finally, Palfrey challenges Delauney to a rematch, and uses various ploys to frustrate him before they even start playing, including making him damage his own car. When they eventually begin the match at the tennis club, with April watching, Palfrey proceeds to win six straight sets with ease, with Potter later graduating him for his successful application of his education. Delauney, angered by what has happened, belittles Palfrey after he departs, only to disgust April by his behaviour, who proceeds to leave and joins Palfrey for a drink. Shortly after she leaves, Delauney notices Potter surveying him before departing, and soon becomes suspicious of this. He quickly follows after him, when a staff member at the club mentions witnessing the scene between them and Palfrey.

Meanwhile, Palfrey brings April to his apartment where he proceeds to use his wooing tricks on her, including spilling her drink on her dress, and convincing her to put on his dressing gown. Eventually she winds up in his bedroom, but Palfrey finds himself unable to take advantage of her. Before he can send her home, Delauney barges in, dragging Potter with him, and reveals the truth by what happened at the tennis club. However, April realises that Palfrey's sudden decision to send her home was because he genuinely loves her, leading them to embrace. Both Delauney and Potter are disgusted by Palfrey's display of sincerity, with the latter breaking the  "fourth wall" to apologise to the audience for his pupil's behaviour. The film ends with Delauney getting off the train at Yeovil station and heading in the direction of the school.

Cast

 Ian Carmichael as Henry Palfrey
 Terry-Thomas as Raymond Delauney
 Alastair Sim as Mr. S. Potter
 Janette Scott as April Smith
 Dennis Price as Dunstan Dorchester
 Peter Jones as Dudley Dorchester
 Edward Chapman as Gloatbridge
 John Le Mesurier as Head Waiter
 Irene Handl as Mrs. Stringer, Palfrey's landlady
 Kynaston Reeves as General
 Hattie Jacques as 1st Instructress
 Hugh Paddick as Instructor
 Barbara Roscoe as 2nd Instructress
 Gerald Campion as Proudfoot, a school student
 Monte Landis as Fleetsnod, a school student
 Jeremy Lloyd as Dingle, a school student
 Charles Lamb as Carpenter
 Anita Sharp-Bolster as Maid

Production
Stephen Potter's original Gamesmanship had been a successful series of books in the 1950s, but were not written in a narrative form, so the device was adopted that Potter (Alastair Sim) had set up a "College of Lifemanship" in Yeovil to educate those seeking to apply his methods for success. Some interest had previously been shown by Cary Grant (with Carl Foreman) in a screen version of Potter's books, but had failed when it proved impossible to translate the dry humour for an American audience. The film's title is a reference to Richard Brinsley Sheridan's 1777 comic play, The School for Scandal.

Although the film only credits its producer, Hal E. Chester, and Patricia Moyes for the screenplay, it was co-written by Peter Ustinov and Frank Tarloff. Its director, Robert Hamer, was sacked during filming due as he returned to drinking and the enterprise was completed by Chester and an (uncredited) Cyril Frankel. Hamer did not work in the film industry again, and died in 1963.

The dishonest car salesmen calling themselves the "Winsome Welshmen", Dunstan (Dennis Price) and Dudley (Peter Jones), were based on similar characters in a 1950s BBC radio comedy series, In All Directions, in which the leads were played by Peter Ustinov and Jones; their catch phrase "run for it!" was recycled in School for Scoundrels.

School for Scoundrels was made at Elstree Studios, and location scenes were mainly shot in the vicinity. The location used as the tennis club was then a private members club before its current incarnation as a hotel. The hotel hosted a screening in 2016 with Janette Scott attending and answering questions about filming School For Scoundrels.

The film uses vehicles as plot devices. Palfrey foolishly buys a "1924 4-litre Swiftmobile" from the crooked "Winsome Welshmen". Later in the film he succeeds in trading the car back to them for an ex-works Austin-Healey 100-six and 100 guineas (£105). The "Swiftmobile" was in fact based upon a 1928 4½ litre Open four-seater Bentley, with a custom two-seat open body. The car, minus the body, was sold by the studio in 1961 for £50, and re-sold (with new body) at an auction in 2003 for £110,000. The Austin-Healey 100-six used in the film was passed in at auction in the 1970s at around £30,000. The "Bellini 3.6" driven by Terry-Thomas is in fact a disguised Aston Martin DB3S.

Release
After passing the British censors on 14 December 1959 School for Scoundrels premiered at the Warner Theatre in Leicester Square, London on 24 March 1960. When the film was released in the United States on 11 July 1960, it was given the subtitle "or How to Win Without Actually Cheating!", reflected in the US poster by Tom Jung.

Reception
Kine Weekly called it a "money maker" at the British box office in 1960. 

While the review in The Times was very noncommittal, Leslie Halliwell described the film as "an amusing trifle, basically a series of sketches by familiar comic actors", and awarded it one star (of a maximum of four and a minimum of zero).

Michael Brooke, reviewing for the British Film Institute' Screenoline website, criticised the film as having "little sign of the elegance and wit that characterised earlier Hamer films such as Kind Hearts and Coronets or The Spider and the Fly", but praised its script and performances, particularly those of Terry-Thomas and an under-used Sim.

In 2007, CNN listed the performance of Terry-Thomas among the top 10 British villains, stating, "generally found twirling his cigarette holder while charming the ladies — at least, when not swindling, cheating or behaving like an absolute rotter."

References

External links 
  
 

1960 films
1960 comedy films
British comedy films
British black-and-white films
Films shot at Associated British Studios
Films about con artists
Films directed by Robert Hamer
Films scored by John Addison
Films set in schools
Films set in London
Films set in Somerset
1960s English-language films
1960s British films